The 71st Fighter Wing (71 FW) is a disbanded unit of the United States Air Force, last stationed at Lambert Field, St. Louis, Missouri. It was withdrawn from the Missouri Air National Guard (MO ANG) and inactivated on 31 October 1950.

This wing is not related to the 71st Tactical Reconnaissance Wing or subsequent units that was constituted on 18 August 1948 and activated on 25 October 1948.

History

World War II
Established and organized at March Field, California in 1943 as a command and control organization.   Deployed to the European Theater of Operations (ETO) in late 1943 and assigned to IX Fighter Command, Ninth Air Force.  Initial Mission of the Wing was to receive operational orders from Headquarters, IX Fighter Command and direct subordinate groups in attacking enemy targets in Occupied France and the Low Countries in preparation for the Normandy Invasion in June 1944.    Targets included bridges, roads, railroads and enemy interceptor aircraft both on the ground as well as in air-to-air combat.

After the D-Day invasion, was directed to provide ground support for advancing United States First Army forces in France, attacking enemy targets initially in the Cotentin Peninsula, then supported Operation Cobra, the breakout of Normandy and attacked enemy forces in the Falaise-Argentan Gap.

Reassigned to IX Air Defense Command on 1 July 1944, its mission was changed to provide air defense against attacking enemy aircraft over liberated areas of France and later, the Low Countries. Wing headquarters and subordinate units operated primarily from liberated airfields and newly built temporary Advanced Landing Grounds in continental Europe.  Along with air defense, subordinate units engaged in combat in support of ground forces during the breakthrough at St. Lo in July 1944. Attacked tanks, trucks, and troop concentrations as enemy retreated; provided armed reconnaissance for advancing Allied armored columns. During September 1944, attacked flak positions near Eindhoven during Operation Market-Garden, the airborne landing in the Netherlands; bombed enemy communications and transportation lines in western Germany. Flew armed reconnaissance missions over Battle of the Bulge during December 1944 – January 1944.  Flew missions against enemy transportation systems including motor vehicles, bridges, trains, railway bridges, and marshalling yards during February and March 1945. Moved to Germany in April 1945, flying last combat missions on 3 May 1945.

Remained in Europe after the war as part of United States Air Forces in Europe, performing occupation duty and the destruction or shipment to the United States of captured enemy combat equipment.  Demobilized in Germany and organization was inactivated as an administrative unit in the United States, December 1945.

Air National Guard
Allocated to the Missouri Air National Guard for command and control origination for units in the Midwest Region (North & South Dakota, Minnesota, Nebraska, Iowa, Kansas, Missouri) of the United States.  Extended federal recognition and activated on 3 July 1946.

At the end of October 1950, the Air National Guard converted to the wing-base (Hobson Plan) organization. As a result, the wing was withdrawn from the Missouri ANG and was inactivated on 31 October 1950.  The 131st Composite Wing was established by the National Guard Bureau, allocated to the state of Missouri, recognized and activated 1 November 1950; assuming the personnel, equipment and mission of the inactivated 71st Fighter Wing.

Operations and decorations
 Combat Operations:  Combat in European Theater of Operations (ETO), 23 December 1943-May 1945.
 Campaigns: Air Offensive, Europe ;Normandy; Northern France
 Decorations: Cited in the Order of the Day, Belgian Army: 6 Jun-6 Jun-[Aug] 1944

Lineage
 Organized as 71st Fighter Wing on 11 Oct 1943
 Activated on 15 August 1943
 Inactivated on 3 December 1945
 Allotted to the Missouri ANG on 24 May 1946
 Extended federal recognition and activated on 3 July 1946
 Inactivated, and returned to the control of the Department of the Air Force, on 31 October 1950
 Disbanded on 15 June 1983

Assignments
 Fourth Air Force, 15 August – 23 December 1943
 IX Fighter Command, 4 December 1943 – 1 July 1944
 IX Air Defense Command, 1 July 1944 – November 1945
 Missouri Air National Guard, 3 July 1946 – 31 October 1950

Components

World War II
 358th Fighter Group: (P-47 Thunderbolt), 1 August-1 October 1944
 Attached to: IX Tactical Air Command, entire period
 366th Fighter Group: (P-47 Thunderbolt), 10 January 1944 – 3 December 1945
 368th Fighter Group: (P-47 Thunderbolt), 1 August-1 October 1944
 Attached to: IX Tactical Air Command, entire period
 370th Fighter Group: (P-38 Lightning), 1 August-1 October 1944
 Attached to: IX Tactical Air Command, entire period
 422d Night Fighter Squadron: (P-61 Black Widow), 4 May-6 August 1944

Missouri Air National Guard
 131st Fighter Group, 15 July 1946 – 31 October 1950
 132d Fighter Group, 23 August 1946 – 31 October 1950 (Iowa ANG)
 133d Fighter Group, 28 August 1947 – 31 October 1950 (Minnesota ANG)
 136th Fighter Group, 27 January 1947 – 23 May 1948 (Texas ANG)
 137th Fighter Group, 18 December 1947 – 23 May 1948 (Oklahoma ANG)
 122d Bombardment Group (Light), 5 December 1946 – 23 May 1948 (Louisiana ANG)
 154th Fighter Squadron, 27 May 1946 – 2 October 1947 (Arkansas ANG)
 175th Fighter Squadron, 20 September 1946 – 28 August 1947 (South Dakota ANG)

Stations

 March Field, California, 15 August – 26 November 1943
 RAF Aldermaston (AAF-467), England, 23 December 1943
 RAF Greenham Common (AAF-486), England, 14 January 1944
 RAF Andover (AAF-406), England, 1 March – 4 July 1944
 Ecrammeville, France, 7 July 1944
 St-Pierre-Eglise, France, 4 August 1944
 Ecrammeville, France, 7 August 1944
 Rennes Airfield (A-27), France, 20 August 1944

 Versailles, France, 9 September 1944
 Vittel, France, 23 October 1944
 Heidelberg, Germany, 23 April 1945
 Nancy, France, 21 May 1945
 Nancy/Essey Airfield (Y-42), France, 16 July 1945
 Darmstadt, Germany, 25 September–November 1945
 Camp Shanks, New York, 2–3 December 1945
 Lambert Field, St. Louis, Missouri, 3 July 1946 – 31 October 1950

References

 Maurer, Maurer (1983). Air Force Combat Units of World War II. Maxwell AFB, Alabama: Office of Air Force History. 
 Johnson, David C. (1988), U.S. Army Air Forces Continental Airfields (ETO), D-Day to V-E Day; Research Division, USAF Historical Research Center, Maxwell AFB, Alabama.

071
071
0071
Military units and formations established in 1943
Military units and formations disestablished in 1950